Franklin is an unincorporated community in Crawford County, Kansas, United States. As of the 2020 census, the population of the community and nearby areas was 473.

History
Franklin began as a mining community in the early 1900s.  It is located just off Highway 69 Bypass which is a major corridor between Kansas City and Pittsburg, Ks./Joplin, Mo. Franklin was a shipping point on the Joplin & Pittsburg electric railroad.  The first post office in Franklin was established in 1908.

Franklin was all but destroyed, the U.S. Post Office, community center, and approximately 1/3 of family homes were destroyed. Four deaths and approximately 20 injuries were reported.

Franklin has a post office with ZIP code 66735.

Demographics

For statistical purposes, the United States Census Bureau has defined Franklin as a census-designated place (CDP).

Area attractions

Miners Hall Museum
Opened on May 1, 2012, the Miner’s Hall Museum was established to preserve and present authentic materials and artifacts that document the history of coal mining and its impact on Southeast Kansas. One exhibit is of the "Amazon Army", a 1921 protest in which thousands of wives, daughters, mothers, sisters and sweethearts of striking coal miners halted work in the mines for three days.

Franklin Sidewalk
Constructed in 1936 with federal funding assistance, the Franklin Sidewalk connects two rural mining communities in Crawford County - Arma and Franklin. The 3-foot wide sidewalk begins at the south edge of Arma and stretches south 1.7 miles to the south edge of Franklin. It has become well known as the "longest sidewalk connecting two communities". It runs adjacent to Business 69 Highway also known as "Jefferson Highway" and the "Frontier Military Scenic Byway". The Franklin Sidewalk appeared in the Guinness Book of World Records in the 1950s or 1960s. It was listed on the National Register of Historic Places by the United States Department of the Interior March 16, 2007 and on the Kansas Register of Historic Places November 18, 2006.

Notable people
 Frank Wayenberg, baseball player

References

Further reading

External links
 Community of Franklin
 USD 246, local school district
 Crawford County maps: Current, Historic, KDOT

Census-designated places in Crawford County, Kansas